The Kumanichi Road Race is an annual road running competition over 30 kilometres which is typically held in February in Kumamoto, Japan. It was first held in 1957 as a men-only competition. A women's race was introduced in 2006. The race is one of the world's most prominent over the uncommon 30K distance. A total of eight Association of Road Racing Statisticians-recognised men's world records have been set at the competition, including the current world record.

The course records are held by Takayuki Matsumiya (1:28:00) and Yuka Hakoyama (1:43:26). It is mostly contested by Japanese athletes, with Kenya's Willy Kangogo becoming the event's sole non-national winner in 2007.

Past winners
Key:

References

List of winners
Kumanichi 30 km. Association of Road Racing Statisticians. Retrieved 2018-04-28.

Half marathons
Road running competitions in Japan
Recurring sporting events established in 1957
Long-distance running competitions